Combo Racer is a Sidecar video game developed by Imagetic Design and published by Gremlin Graphics in 1990. The game uses an isometric view and the player has to change gear manually. It contains a training mode, a normal game mode and a track editor.

References

External links
Play Combo Racer online
https://web.archive.org/web/20110804213510/http://www.thelegacy.de/Museum/game.php3?titel_id=7143&game_id=7221

1990 video games
Amiga games
Atari ST games
Europe-exclusive video games
Video games scored by Barry Leitch
Video games developed in the United Kingdom